The 1964 All-Ireland Under-21 Football Championship was the inaugural staging of the All-Ireland Under-21 Football Championship.

Kerry won the championship following a 1-10 to 1-3 defeat of Laois in the All-Ireland final.

Results

All-Ireland Under-21 Football Championship

Semi-finals

Final

Statistics

Miscellaneous

 The All-Ireland final was played as part of a triple-header at Croke Park. It provided a curtain-raiser to the All-Ireland junior finals in both hurling and football.

References

1964
All-Ireland Under-21 Football Championship